The 2021 Toyota 200 presented by CK Power was the 16th stock car race of the 2021 NASCAR Camping World Truck Series season, the 21st iteration of the event, the first race of the playoffs, and the first race of the Round of 10. The race was held on Friday, August 20, 2021 in Madison, Illinois at World Wide Technology Raceway. The race was extended from 160 laps to 163 due to a NASCAR overtime finish. After dominating most of the race, Sheldon Creed of GMS Racing would win the race and lock himself into the Round of 8. To fill the rest of the podium, Matt Crafton and Ben Rhodes, both from ThorSport Racing would finish 2nd and 3rd, respectively. 

The race was the debut for Chris Hacker and Armani Williams.

Background 

Known as Gateway Motorsports Park until its renaming in April 2019, World Wide Technology Raceway is a 1.25-mile (2.01 km) paved oval motor racing track in Madison, Illinois, United States. The track previously held Truck races from 1998 to 2010, and returned starting in 2014.

Entry list 

*Withdrew due to the team breaking the rules, as they did not know they had run an illegal nose on the car. NASCAR rules state that 2018 bodies for the car after June 30, 2021 are only allowed for dirt races and road courses, and as Norm Benning had a 2018 body, they were forced to withdraw.

**Withdrew due to unknown reasons.

***Driver changed to Chris Hacker in order for Hacker to make his NASCAR Camping World Truck Series debut.

Starting lineup 
Qualifying was determined by a qualifying metric system based on the previous race, the 2021 United Rentals 176 at The Glen and owner's points. As a result, Austin Hill of Hattori Racing Enterprises would win the pole.

The entry of Clay Greenfield of Clay Greenfield Motorsports and the initial entry of Chris Hacker for On Point Motorsports would fail to qualify, albeit Hacker would replace Lawless Alan in the #34 Reaume Brothers Racing truck to ensure that he would make his debut.

Race

Pre-race ceremonies

Race recap

Post-race driver comments

Race results 
Stage 1 Laps: 55

Stage 2 Laps: 55

Stage 3 Laps: 50

References 

2021 NASCAR Camping World Truck Series
NASCAR races at Gateway Motorsports Park
Toyota 200
Toyota 200